The Aline IOOF Lodge No. 263 is an Odd Fellows building in Aline, Oklahoma that was built in 1930.  It has served historically as a clubhouse, as a restaurant, and as a specialty store.  It was listed in the National Register of Historic Places in 1984.

It is one of four historic, surviving Odd Fellows buildings in Alfalfa County that were subject of a 1983 study.  The others are the Carmen IOOF Lodge No. 84 and the Carmen IOOF Home in Carmen, and the Cherokee IOOF Lodge No. 219 in Cherokee.

References

Clubhouses on the National Register of Historic Places in Oklahoma
Buildings and structures in Alfalfa County, Oklahoma
Odd Fellows buildings in Oklahoma
National Register of Historic Places in Alfalfa County, Oklahoma